John Joy may refer to:

 John Joye, English politician
 John Cantiloe Joy (1805–1859), English marine painter